The Falcon radio series premiered on the Blue Network on April 10, 1943, continuing on NBC and Mutual until November 27, 1954. Some 70 episodes were produced.

Background

"Drexel Drake" (a pseudonym of Charles H. Huff) created Michael Waring, alias the Falcon, a free-lance investigator and troubleshooter, in his 1936 novel, The Falcon's Prey. It was followed by two more novels (The Falcon Cuts In, 1937 and The Falcon Meets a Lady, 1938) and a 1938 short story. In 1941, RKO Radio Pictures launched a Falcon movie series, but that was based on a different character (Gay Lawrence) by a different author (Michael Arlen). Only the popularity of the film series prompted the radio series; the film and radio series were otherwise unrelated. The radio series was based on the Drexel Drake character. No explanation for the nickname was ever mentioned in any of the dramatizations. 

The Michael Waring Falcon was also the hero in three late 1940s movies starring John Calvert, and a television series starring Charles McGraw.

Characters and story

Like the Falcon film series, the radio plots mixed danger, romance and comedy in equal parts. Each show began with a telephone ringing and Michael Waring, the Falcon, answering the phone. Speaking with a woman whose voice was never heard, Waring would explain that he had an urgent situation in which he had to deal with criminals. This led into the standard opening, followed by the week's tale of adventure. Often, incompetent police were unable to solve the mysteries without his help.

Actors
The program's characters and the actors who played them are indicated in the table below.

Source (except for years): Radio Programs, 1924-1984: A Catalog of More Than 1800 Shows

Those heard in supporting roles included Robert Dryden, Ethel Everett and Everett Sloane. Russ Dunbar and Ed Herlihy were the announcers. The organist was Bob Hamilton, with Emerson Buckley and Harry Sosnik as orchestra leaders. Bernarld L. Schubert was the producer.

References

External links
Internet Archive: The Falcon (all available episodes, certified by OTRR)
Zoot Radio, free old time radio show downloads of 'The Falcon.'

1943 radio programme debuts
1954 radio programme endings
1940s American radio programs
1950s American radio programs
Mutual Broadcasting System programs
NBC Blue Network radio programs
NBC radio programs
Detective radio shows